The sulphur-bellied flycatcher (Myiodynastes luteiventris) is a large tyrant flycatcher.  This bird breeds from southeasternmost Arizona of the United States (the Madrean sky islands region of Arizona, southwestern New Mexico, and northern Sonora, Mexico) to Costa Rica.  They are short distance migrants, spending winters in the eastern Andean foothills of Colombia, Ecuador, Peru, Bolivia, and Brazil, and are passage migrants over the southern portions of Central America.

The most distinguishing characteristics of this flycatcher are the heavy streaking of its plumage, and its pale yellow belly. The bird also shows a rusty brown tail, and a black eyestripe. Its call sounds like noises made by squeaky toys.

Sulphur-bellied flycatchers usually occur in woodlands of montane canyons, at elevations between 1000 and 2000 meters. They make a cup nest in a tree cavity or old woodpecker hole. The female lays two to four eggs.

They wait on an open perch usually rather high or on top of the tree and fly out to catch insects in flight (hawking). They will also take berries and seeds.

References

Further reading

External links
Videos, photos and sounds - Internet Bird Collection
Photo gallery - VIREO

sulphur-bellied flycatcher
Native birds of the Southwestern United States
Birds of Central America
Birds of the Yucatán Peninsula
sulphur-bellied flycatcher
sulphur-bellied flycatcher